The Colegio Militar Caldas or Caldas Military Academy, is a private military school in Bogotá, Colombia

The school was founded in 1960 by the Cooperative of Retired Soldiers  under the name Colegio Militar Cooperativo. it was first located on the site of the "Ramírez Military Academy"

exactly the "Francisco Miranda: neighborhood, 106th Street and 9th Avenue, near to the Canton Norte.

Overview 

The academy was originally  The installations located in Usaquen,  It later moved to Tenjo, Cundinamarca.

The academy was originally directed by Colonel Camilo Acevedo Velez and Mayor Pinillos, and was part of the military system of the Colombian Armed Forces.   From 1960 to 1970 the students used the same military uniform as the armed forces, then by a government ordinance the military academies had to have a different uniform, also the military training was reduced to basic military service. From 1960 to 1989 the academy was part of the Infantry armed forces, then become part of the Cavalry forces.  In the early 1990s women students were accepted.

The academy offers elementary and secondary schooling . The students also get military training and they receive the title of sub-official of the reserve army.

The buildings were 6 x 6 city blocks that included a soccer field and parade camp, volleyball and basketball fields, main building and class rooms for the students: One with 5 floors was a dormitory for the permanent students.

Alumni 
One of the former students, Roberto Convers, become the Vice-Principal.  Other alumni include Rafael Cely Vega and his brother Luis Cely Vega of the Colombian Police and the GAULA division of the Colombian Army.  Only one student: Brigadier Cely Vega (Rafael) become an effective lieutenant of the armed forces.

The alumni  participate in parades and events such as the 20 of July Independence's Parade, also in 1969 they were the Honor Guard for the visit to Colombia of Pope Paul VI.

References

Military of Colombia
Schools in Bogotá
1960 establishments in Colombia
Educational institutions established in 1960
Military schools